King of Kings was a professional wrestling supercard event produced by Major League Wrestling (MLW), which took place on December 20, 2002 at the War Memorial Auditorium in Fort Lauderdale, Florida.

Nine professional wrestling matches were contested at the event. In the main event, Satoshi Kojima retained the MLW World Heavyweight Championship against Vampiro. In other prominent matches on the card, Sabu defeated La Parka and Mike Awesome defeated Jerry Lynn and the Global Tag Team Championship was introduced as the semi-final round of the tournament for the tag team titles took place at the event.

Results

Tournament brackets

References

External links
Major League Wrestling official website

2002 in professional wrestling
Events in Fort Lauderdale, Florida
Professional wrestling in Florida
2002 in Florida
Events in Florida
December 2002 sports events in the United States
Major League Wrestling shows